Isaias Guadalupe "Lupe" Aquino (born 23 January 1963) is a Mexican former professional boxer who competed from 1981 to 1999.

Aquino, known as "Lupe", turned pro in 1981 and won the WBC light middleweight title in 1987 with a decision over Duane Thomas. He lost the title in his first defense via a close decision to Gianfranco Rosi. In 1988 Aquino took on John David Jackson for the inaugural WBO light middleweight title. In the fight, Aquino was put down in 1st and retired after the 7th round.  In 1993, Aquino would again challenge for the  vacant WBO light middleweight title against Verno Phillips on a Top Rank fight card that also featured Michael Carbajal's successful defense of the unified WBC and IBF light flyweight titles against challenger Domingo Sosa as well as up and coming prospect Oscar De La Hoya. Philips defeated Aquino by 7th round technical knockout (0:57).  After the loss to Philips, Aquino continued to fight until 1999 but never again challenged for a major title.  His most notable fight in that time period was likely against Bernard Hopkins, which he lost by unanimous decision.

Aquino also has a fifth-round technical knockout win over former number-one ranked and convicted serial killer and (convicted) robber Steve Hearon.

See also
List of WBC world champions
List of Mexican boxing world champions

References

External links
 

1963 births
Living people
Mexican male boxers
Middleweight boxers
Light-middleweight boxers
Welterweight boxers
World Boxing Council champions
World light-middleweight boxing champions
Boxers from Chihuahua (state)
People from Chihuahua City